"Lovin', Touchin', Squeezin'" is a song by American rock group Journey released as a single in 1979 from the album Evolution.

Chart performance
The song was Journey's first Top 40 hit in the United States, reaching No. 16 on the Billboard Hot 100 in November of that year. Outside the US, "Lovin', Touchin', Squeezin'" reached No. 12 in Canada and No. 37 in New Zealand.

Music video
In July 1979, a music video was released for this song. It was directed by Bruce Gowers, best known for directing videos for Queen, Michael Jackson, and Prince.

Personnel
Steve Perry – lead vocals
Neal Schon – guitars, backing vocals
Gregg Rolie – keyboards, piano, backing vocals
Ross Valory – bass guitar, backing vocals
Steve Smith – drums, backing vocals

Additional musicians
Greg Werner – backing vocals

Cover versions
"Lovin', Touchin', Squeezin'" was covered by progressive metal band Dream Theater on their EP, A Change of Seasons, in 1995.

Use in media
The original recording of "Lovin', Touchin', Squeezin'" appeared in the pilot episode of Glee and was used and recorded by the cast of Glee in a mash-up with "Any Way You Want It" for the first-season finale. 
The song was used in the second episode of the fifteenth season of American Dad!, “Paranoid Frandroid”, as a song on Snot’s jukebox in his basement.

References

1979 songs
1979 singles
Journey (band) songs
Songs written by Steve Perry
Songs written by Neal Schon
Song recordings produced by Roy Thomas Baker
Music videos directed by Bruce Gowers
Columbia Records singles